Cheran may refer to:

Cheran (dynasty), of Karuvur, the name of a Tamil dynasty in south India (2nd century BC – 3rd century AD). The epithet was later used by a number of other ruling clans in south India, most notably the Ceras of Kongu and Cranganore.
Cheran (director) (b. 1970), a Tamil film director
Cherán, a municipality the Mexican state of Michoacán
Chéran, a river in eastern France
Cheran, Nalanda, a village in Bihar, India
Cheran, Iran (disambiguation)